Hozat District is a district of Tunceli Province in Turkey. The town of Hozat is its seat and the district had a population of 5,590 in 2021.

Composition 
Beside the town of Hozat, the district encompasses thirty villages and 112 hamlets.

Villages 

 Akpınar
 Alancık
 Altınçevre
 Balkaynar
 Beşelma
 Bilekli
 Boydaş
 Buzlupınar
 Çağlarca
 Çaytaşı
 Çığırlı
 Dalören
 Dervişcemal
 Geçimli
 İnköy
 Kalecik
 Karabakır
 Karacaköy
 Karaçavuş
 Kardelen
 Kavuktepe
 Koruköy
 Kozluca
 Kurukaymak
 Sarısaltık
 Taşıtlı
 Türktaner
 Uzundal
 Yenidoğdu
 Yüceldi

References 

Districts of Tunceli Province
Hozat District